Nicole Bernegger (née Schlachter; born 10 March 1977) is a Swiss soul singer who was the winner of the first season of The Voice of Switzerland. She is also the lead singer of the soul band "The Kitchenettes", founded in 2003.

Biography
Bernegger, who was born as Nicole Schlachter, was born and raised in Möhlin, Aargau. At the age of 20, she moved to Basel to study German and history.

In 2012–2013, Bernegger took part in the first season of the Swiss reality talent show The Voice of Switzerland. When she won the final on 16 March 2013, she was in the seventh month of her pregnancy. The winning single "No Matter" reached number one on the Swiss iTunes charts and #4 on the singles chart. Half a year after winning, she released her first album called The Voice. It reached number three on the Swiss albums chart and was certified gold for selling more than 10,000 copies.

Personal life
Bernegger lives with her husband Daniel and three children in Birsfelden in the canton of Basel-Landschaft.

Discography 
Studio Albums
 The Voice (2013)
 Small Town (2015)
 Alien Pearl (2019)

Singles

As lead artist
 No Matter (2013)
 The Fool (2013)
 Don't Stay Away (2015)

As featured artist
 Horizon / Stress featuring Nicole Bernegger (2014)

References

External links 

 Official Website
 Website of The Kitchenettes

1977 births
Living people
People from Rheinfelden District
Swiss soul singers
21st-century Swiss women singers
The Voice (franchise) winners